Martins Creek or Martin Creek may refer to several places:

Australia
 Martins Creek, New South Wales, a small village in the Hunter Valley
 Martins Creek railway station
 Martins Creek, a tributary of the Karuah River in the Great Lakes Council area
 Martins Creek, a tributary of the Nattai River in the Wollondilly Shire

United States

Inhabited places
Brainards, New Jersey, formerly known as Martin's Creek
Martins Creek, North Carolina, an unincorporated community in Cherokee County
Martins Creek, Pennsylvania , an unincorporated town in Northampton County

Waterways
Martin Creek (Sausal Creek tributary), a creek in California
Martin Creek (Larabee Creek tributary), a creek in California
Martin Creek (Chestatee River tributary), a stream in the U.S. state of Georgia
Martin Creek (Hiwassee River tributary), a stream in North Carolina
Martins Creek (Delaware River tributary, Bucks County), Tullytown, Pennsylvania
Martins Creek (Delaware River tributary), a stream in eastern Pennsylvania
Martins Creek (Tunkhannock Creek tributary), a stream in northeastern Pennsylvania
Martin Creek (Susquehanna River tributary), Wyoming County, Pennsylvania

See also 
 Marten Creek (disambiguation)